Conway's Latest Greatest Hits Volume 1 is a compilation album by American country music artist Conway Twitty. It was released in 1984 via Warner Bros. Records. The album includes the hit single "Ain't She Somethin' Else".

Track listing

Chart performance

References

1984 compilation albums
Conway Twitty songs
Albums produced by Jimmy Bowen
Warner Records compilation albums